Turf Club may refer to:

 Turf Club (gentlemen's club), a club in London, UK
 Turf Club, Gauteng, a suburb of Johannesburg, South Africa
 Turf Club (venue), a live music venue and restaurant in Saint Paul, Minnesota, U.S.
 Turf Club (New Jersey), a live music venue in Asbury Park, New Jersey

Horse racing clubs
 Penang Turf Club
 Perak Turf Club, Ipoh, Perak, Malaysia
 Pony Turf Club, a regulating body in the United Kingdom from 1923 to the early 1950s
 Royal Calcutta Turf Club
 Royal Western India Turf Club, Mumbai
 Selangor Turf Club, Klang Valley, Selangor, Malaysia
 Singapore Turf Club
 Turf Club (Ireland), regulatory body for horse racing in Ireland

Australia
 Australian Turf Club, Sydney
 Gold Coast Turf Club, Surfers Paradise, Queensland
 Lismore Turf Club, Lismore, New South Wales
 Melbourne Racing Club
 Queensland Turf Club, Ascot, Queensland
 Sydney Turf Club
 Western Australian Turf Club, Perth